Afrotrichona is a monotypic genus of east African sheet weavers containing the single species, Afrotrichona mahnerti. It was first described by A. V. Tanasevitch in 2020, and it has only been found in Kenya.

See also
 List of Linyphiidae species (A–H)

References

Monotypic Linyphiidae genera
Arthropods of Kenya